Johann Christoph Glaubitz ( – 30 March 1767) was an architect of German descent who is generally considered to be the most prominent Baroque architect in the lands of the former Grand Duchy of Lithuania.

Early life 
Glaubitz was born in Schweidnitz (Świdnica), Duchies of Silesia, and spent the first 37 years of his life there.

Architecture 
After a devastating fire occurred in 1737 in Vilnius, he was called to rebuild Catholic St. Johns' Church, which in 1555 had been funded by German merchants.

Glaubitz, who was among the leaders of the Lutheran community of Vilnius, is credited for developing a distinct Lithuanian school of Baroque architecture, known as Vilnian Baroque, which is best reflected in the cityscape of the Vilnius Old Town. This has contributed to the widespread naming of Old Vilnius as the "City of Baroque".

The magnificent and dynamic Baroque facade of the formerly Gothic Church of St. Johns (1749) is mentioned among his best works. Many church interiors including the one of the Great Synagogue of Vilna were reconstructed by Glaubitz as well as the Town Hall in 1769.

One of Glaubitz's notable buildings was the former Carmelite church of Glubokas (Hlybokaye), which he reconstructed in 1735; it is now the Orthodox Church of the Birth of Theotokos. In 1746—1750 he restored Mscislaŭ Church of the Assumption of the Blessed Virgin Mary. Other towns with Glaubitz's architecture include Mogiliavas (Mogilev), Lyda (Lida), and the Saint Sophia Cathedral in Polotsk, all three in what is now Belarus and Daugavpils in Latvia. The Basilian Church and Monastery in Berezwecz, now part of Hlybokaye, was built in 1776 and demolished in the 1960s and 1970s. Its replica was constructed in Białystok in the 1990s.

See also
 Basilian Monastery in Vilnius

References

Sources
 S. Lorentz, Jan Krzysztof Glaubitz - architekt wileński XVIII wieku, Warszawa 1937

External links

 Church of Sts Peter and Paul
 Church of Birth of Theotokos

1700s births
1767 deaths
Polish Baroque architects
Belarusian Baroque architects
Lithuanian Baroque architects
People from Świdnica
Architects from Vilnius